Javier Díaz (born 26 July 1995) is an Argentine rugby union player who plays for Italian Top10 team Valorugby Emilia. 

On 2 January 2018, Díaz was named in the Jaguares squad for the 2018 Super Rugby season.
He played with Jaguares until 2020 Super Rugby season.

From 2018 Diaz was also named in Argentina XV and  Argentina squad. In 2015 he partecipied to 2015 IRB Junior World Championship with Argentina Under 20.

References

External links
 itsrugby Profile

Jaguares (Super Rugby) players
Rugby union props
Argentine rugby union players
1995 births
Living people
Club Natación y Gimnasia players
Argentina international rugby union players
Yacare XV players
Valorugby Emilia players